Locsín is the surname of a prominent Hiligaynon family whose patriarch, Wo Sin Lok, a Fujianese from Amoy, settled in Molo, Iloilo City in 1700s. He hispanized his name to Agustín Locsín and was baptized a Christian in the Catholic Church. Notable people with the surname include:
 Angel Locsin (born 1985), Filipino actress
 José Locsín (1891–1977), Filipino politician
 Leandro Locsin (1928–94), Filipino architect
 Leandro Locsin Fullon (1874-1904), Filipino general and government administrator
 Noli Locsin (born 1971), Filipino basketball player
 Rozzano Locsin (born 1954), Filipino professor at the University of Tokushima
 Teodoro Locsin Sr. (1914–2000), Filipino journalist and poet
 Teodoro Locsin Jr. (born 1948), Filipino politician

References

Hokkien-language surnames